Masinloc, officially the Municipality of Masinloc, is a 1st class municipality in the province of Zambales, Philippines. According to the 2020 census, it has a population of 54,529 people.

Scarborough Shoal (under the names Pulo ng Panatag and Bajo de Masinloc) is claimed by the Philippine government as within the town's territorial jurisdiction. Due to the continued dispute over the shoal, this has negatively impacted fishermen of the community, reducing catch sizes and affecting other businesses.

Geography

Barangays

Masinloc is politically subdivided into 13 barangays.

 Baloganon
 Bamban
 Bani
 Collat
 Inhobol
 North Poblacion
 San Lorenzo
 San Salvador
 Santa Rita
 Santo Rosario
 South Poblacion
 Taltal
 Tapuac

Climate

Demographics

Diocesan Shrine and Parish of San Andres
Located at Barangay South Población, the 18th-century San Andrés Parish Church has been declared a National Cultural Treasure by the National Museum of the Philippines in July 2001.
On April 4, 2021, Masinloc Church became one of the seven Pilgrim Churches in the Diocese of Iba in celebration of the 500 Years of Christianity in the Philippines, and on November 30 of the same year, San Andres Church was declared as the Diocesan Shrine and Parish of San Andres by Bartolome G. Santos Jr., D.D., Bishop of Iba, with Rev. Fr. John Remel M. Mara, the current Parish Priest, being appointed as its First Rector.

Masinloc Coal Power Plant
An electric company producing electricity up to 950 MW. It uses coal and a steam engine attached to electric generator.

References

External links

Masinloc Profile at PhilAtlas.com
[ Philippine Standard Geographic Code]
Philippine Census Information

Municipalities of Zambales